Lovefest is a summer music festival which is held every first weekend in August in Vrnjačka Banja, Serbia.

The festival program is held on five different stages of which the main one is Fire Stage. That is the biggest stage in the festival where headliners perform. It is famous for its magnificent fireworks and cannons with fire.

There are four more stages:

H2O Stage – stage with the pool. Famous for daily parties and creative water activations.  

99 Stage - the smallest stage in the world with the capacity of 99 people only. Recognizable by clubbing atmosphere.  

Energy Stage - the second most popular stage after the Fire Stage. Surrounded by the trees, popular by tunes of house and afro house and also by special after-hours because Energy Stage is the only stage that works until late in the morning.

Last, but not the least, is Live Stage, recognizable by live concerts of the most famous regional rock, pop, rap and hip hop performers.

History
The festival was founded in 2007 as the electronic music festival, and was ever since organized by group of local youth. Over the last few years, festival had many globally popular performers, including Maceo Plex, Loco Dice, Green Velvet and others.

In 2017, Lovefest attracted 100,000 visitors. For 2017, it was nominated for the "Best Medium-Sized Festival" by European Festivals Awards (EFA).

In 2018, Lovefest won the award for The best Regional Festival of the year, by the Ambassador.hr

Gallery

Festival by year

References

External links
 
 Lovefest at  flightnetwork.com

Pop music festivals
Electronic music festivals in Serbia
Music festivals established in 2007
Summer events in Serbia